Muhammad Waheed Gull is a Pakistani politician who was a Member of the Provincial Assembly of the Punjab, from May 2013 to May 2018.

Early life
He was born on 1 January 1966 in Lahore.

Political career

He was elected to the Provincial Assembly of the Punjab as a candidate of Pakistan Muslim League (Nawaz) from Constituency PP-145 (Lahore-IX) in 2013 Pakistani general election.

References

Living people
Punjab MPAs 2013–2018
1966 births
Pakistan Muslim League (N) politicians